Ettore or Eduardo Ettore Forti was an Italian painter, who was prolific in depicting realistic Neo-Pompeian scenes of Ancient Roman life and events. These subjects were popular in the late-Victorian period, as exemplified by the popularity of Lawrence Alma-Tadema.

There is little definitive information available about Forti's biography. His paintings are signed with his name and Rome. Different sources can not cite a place of birth or birth date, and do not agree about a birth date. Nothing is known of his training. Many sources claim he was active a few decades before and after 1900. He exhibited in Berlin between 1893 and 1897. He exhibited at the Mostra della Romana Società degli Amatori e Cultori in 1905.

One favorite topic is a salesman displaying artwork, jewelry, or rugs to well-dressed female patrician women, often in elegant settings.

References
 

19th-century Italian painters
19th-century Italian male artists
Italian male painters
20th-century Italian painters
20th-century Italian male artists
Neo-Pompeian painters
Year of birth unknown
Year of death unknown